In enzymology, a protein-histidine N-methyltransferase is an enzyme that catalyzes the chemical reaction

S-adenosyl-L-methionine + protein L-histidine  S-adenosyl-L-homocysteine + protein Ntau-methyl-L-histidine

Thus, the two substrates of this enzyme are S-adenosyl methionine and protein L-histidine, whereas its two products are S-adenosylhomocysteine and protein Ntau-methyl-L-histidine.

This enzyme belongs to the family of transferases, specifically those transferring one-carbon group methyltransferases.  The systematic name of this enzyme class is S-adenosyl-L-methionine:protein-L-histidine N-tele-methyltransferase. Other names in common use include protein methylase IV, protein (histidine) methyltransferase, actin-specific histidine methyltransferase, and S-adenosyl methionine:protein-histidine N-methyltransferase.

References

 

EC 2.1.1
Enzymes of unknown structure